Randy Stradley (born March 4, 1956) is an American comic book writer and editor, who spent 35 years in an executive position at Dark Horse Comics. He has written under pseudonyms Mick Harrison and Welles Hartley.

Career 
Stradley began working in comics in 1984 with issue 86 of Marvel's Star Wars. In 1986, he co-founded Dark Horse Comics with Mike Richardson and became its vice president. 

In 1988, Dark Horse acquired the rights to Twentieth Century Fox's Aliens franchise and a year later the Predator license. In 1990, Stradley wrote the crossover, Aliens Versus Predator. 

In the early 1990s Dark Horse acquired the license for Star Wars comics and relaunched the line. Stradley and Richardson co-wrote the Crimson Empire miniseries, and in 2002 Stradley became Senior Editor for Dark Horse's Star Wars series, a role he retained until 2014, when Marvel regained the Star Wars comics rights.

Stradley retired from Dark Horse on February 26, 2021.

Works

Aliens Versus Predator

Aliens Versus Predator (1990)
Aliens Versus Predator: Duel (1995)
Aliens Versus Predator: War (1995)
Aliens Versus Predator: Three World War (2010)

Marvel Star Wars

Star Wars 86: The Alderaan Factor (1984)

Crimson Empire (with Mike Richardson)

Crimson Empire (1997–1998)
Crimson Empire II: Council of Blood (1998–1999)
Crimson Empire III: Empire Lost (2011–2012)

Dark Times

Star Wars: Dark Times 1: The Path to Nowhere, Part 1 (as "Welles Hartley" and "Mick Harrison")
Star Wars: Dark Times 2: The Path to Nowhere, Part 2 (as "Welles Hartley" and "Mick Harrison")
Star Wars: Dark Times 3: The Path to Nowhere, Part 3 (as "Welles Hartley" and "Mick Harrison")
Star Wars: Dark Times 4: The Path to Nowhere, Part 4 (as "Welles Hartley" and "Mick Harrison")
Star Wars: Dark Times 5: The Path to Nowhere, Part 5 (as "Welles Hartley" and "Mick Harrison")
Star Wars: Dark Times 6: Parallels, Part 1 (as "Mick Harrison")
Star Wars: Dark Times 7: Parallels, Part 2 (as "Mick Harrison")
Star Wars: Dark Times 8: Parallels, Part 3 (as "Mick Harrison")
Star Wars: Dark Times 9: Parallels, Part 4 (as "Mick Harrison")
Star Wars: Dark Times 10: Parallels, Part 5 (as "Mick Harrison")
Star Wars: Dark Times 11: Vector, Part 5 (as "Mick Harrison")
Star Wars: Dark Times 12: Vector, Part 6 (as "Mick Harrison")
Star Wars: Dark Times 13: Blue Harvest, Part 1 (as "Mick Harrison")
Star Wars: Dark Times 14: Blue Harvest, Part 2 (as "Mick Harrison")
Star Wars: Dark Times 15: Blue Harvest, Part 3 (as "Mick Harrison")
Star Wars: Dark Times 16: Blue Harvest, Part 4 (as "Mick Harrison")
Star Wars: Dark Times 17: Blue Harvest, Part 5 (as "Mick Harrison")

Empire

Star Wars: Empire 5: Princess... Warrior, Part 1 (2003)
Star Wars: Empire 6: Princess... Warrior, Part 2 (2003)
Star Wars: Empire 16: To the Last Man, Part 1 (as "Welles Hartley")
Star Wars: Empire 17: To the Last Man, Part 2 (as "Welles Hartley")
Star Wars: Empire 18: To the Last Man, Part 3 (as "Welles Hartley")
Star Wars: Empire 22: Alone Together (as "Welles Hartley")
Star Wars: Empire 36: The Wrong Side of the War, Part 1 (as "Welles Hartley")
Star Wars: Empire 37: The Wrong Side of the War, Part 2 (as "Welles Hartley")
Star Wars: Empire 38: The Wrong Side of the War, Part 3 (as "Welles Hartley")
Star Wars: Empire 39: The Wrong Side of the War, Part 4 (as "Welles Hartley")
Star Wars: Empire 40: The Wrong Side of the War, Part 5 (as "Welles Hartley")

Jedi Council

Jedi Council: Acts of War 1
Jedi Council: Acts of War 2
Jedi Council: Acts of War 3
Jedi Council: Acts of War 4

Republic

Star Wars: Republic 67: Forever Young (2004)
Star Wars: Republic 79: Into the Unknown, Part 1 (as "Welles Hartley")
Star Wars: Republic 80: Into the Unknown, Part 2 (as "Welles Hartley")

Star Wars Tales

Jedi Chef—Star Wars Tales 7 in Star Wars Tales 7 (2001)

The Bounty Hunters

The Bounty Hunters: Kenix Kil (1999)

Other

Clone Wars Adventures (2004–2007)
Hide in Plain Sight—Star Wars: Clone Wars Adventures Volume 2 (as "Welles Hartley")
Hard Currency
Routine Valor (2006)
Star Wars: Panel to Panel
Star Wars: Panel to Panel Volume 2: Expanding the Universe
Star Wars: The Clone Wars –Innocents of Ryloth (co-writer)

References

Dark Horse Comics
1950s births
Living people